The sparrow pebblesnail, scientific name Somatogyrus parvulus, is a species of minute freshwater snail that has an operculum, an aquatic operculate gastropod mollusk in the family Hydrobiidae. This species is endemic to the United States.  Its natural habitat is rivers.

References

Endemic fauna of the United States
Somatogyrus
Gastropods described in 1865
Taxa named by George Washington Tryon
Taxonomy articles created by Polbot